Robert Cecil Cole  (born June 24, 1933) is a Canadian former sports television announcer who has worked for CBC and Sportsnet and former competitive curler. He is known primarily for his work on Hockey Night in Canada.

Early life
A knee injury suffered from playing soccer put Cole in the hospital for approximately six months as a youth. It was during this time that he would listen to Foster Hewitt calling games on the radio and developed an interest in becoming a sports announcer. In 1956, Cole made an impromptu visit to Hewitt's office to present him with an audition tape. To Cole's surprise, Hewitt welcomed him in, listened to his tape, and talked with him for two hours.

Ice hockey

Hockey Night in Canada
Cole began broadcasting hockey on VOCM radio in St. John's, Newfoundland, then CBC Radio in 1969 and moved to television in 1973 when Hockey Night in Canada (HNIC) expanded its coverage. Cole was the lead play-by-play announcer for HNIC on CBC, usually working Toronto Maple Leafs games, from 1980 to 2008. Aside from the Leafs broadcasts, he was also a staple for HNIC during the annual Stanley Cup playoffs. He broadcast at least one game in every Stanley Cup Finals from 1980 until 2008, after which he was replaced by Jim Hughson. His voice was also heard by a United States television audience whenever that country's carrier at the time – Hughes, USA, SportsChannel America or NBCSN – simulcast an HNIC game that he was calling.

In November 2013, Rogers Communications reached a 12-year deal to become the exclusive national television and digital rightsholder for the NHL in Canada, beginning with the 2014–15 season. Although now at the age of 82, Cole told the Toronto Sun that he wanted Rogers to call and tell him if he would be a part of their hockey coverage: "I still feel the same as when I was 50. I still love what I'm doing. I just want to do games." Cole later stated, "I'd like to keep going. I feel good. I love the game. I still get passionate. I still get butterflies." In June 2014, Rogers confirmed that Cole would be part of their play-by-play team."

Sportsnet did not give any on-air assignments to Cole during the 2018 Stanley Cup playoffs. On September 27, 2018, Sportsnet announced that Cole would be calling his 50th and last season with Hockey Night in Canada and a limited schedule of games in the upcoming season.

On February 6, 2019, Cole received a video tribute and a standing ovation, during the Toronto Maple Leafs - Ottawa Senators game, on the occasion of calling his last game in Toronto. His final play by play broadcast was on April 6, 2019 at the Bell Centre in Montreal as the Montreal Canadiens beat the Toronto Maple Leafs by a score of 6-5 in a shootout. This game also happened to hold historical significance, as Canadiens forward Ryan Poehling scored a hat trick and a shootout goal in what was his first NHL game.  Cole's broadcasting career spanned 50 years.

Olympics
Cole's work during CBC's broadcasts of the Olympic games have also become memorable among legions of Canadians. His call on the final shot of the shootout in the semi-final game of the 1998 Winter Olympics at Nagano between Canada and the Czech Republic represented Canada's then-ongoing failure at the games and haunted fans for the next four years. With Canada scoreless in the shootout and Brendan Shanahan representing their last chance, Cole said in a panicked voice as Shanahan skated in towards Czech goalie Dominik Hasek, "He's gotta score, that's all!" But Shanahan was stopped by Hasek, prompting Cole to dejectedly say "No, he can't do it."

At the gold medal game of the 2002 Winter Olympics in Salt Lake City between Canada and the United States, Cole's animated call of Joe Sakic's second goal of the game is also one of his more memorable moments.  Also, when Jarome Iginla scored Canada's fourth goal of the game, with four minutes remaining in the third period, Cole was so excited when the goal was scored he yelled out "GORE!" (a hybrid of "goal" and "score"), and then proceeded to call out "Goal, Canada! Goal! Wow! A lot of Canadian fans here! The place goes crazy here in Salt Lake City, and I guess coast to coast in Canada, and all around the world!" When Sakic scored Canada's fifth goal with one minute and twenty seconds remaining, Cole yelled out "Scores! Joe Sakic scores! And that makes it 5-2 Canada! Surely, that's gotta be it!" As the final seconds of the game ticked away, and as the crowd broke out in perfect unison singing "O Canada", Cole said, "Now after 50 years, it's time for Canada to stand up and cheer. Stand up and cheer everybody! The Olympics Salt Lake City, 2002, men's ice hockey, gold medal: Canada!"

With an average Canadian audience of 10.6 million viewers, that game was the most-watched CBC Sports program, beating the previous record of 4.957 million viewers for Game 7 of the 1994 Stanley Cup Finals (the final game of the 1972 Summit Series between an NHL all-star team and the Soviet Union, which had been the most-watched sports program Canadian television history, was simulcast on CBC and CTV while Cole called the game on CBC Radio), in which the New York Rangers won their first Stanley Cup in 54 years, beating the Vancouver Canucks, another moment Cole himself called: "The New York Rangers have done it here on a hot June night in New York! The Rangers are Stanley Cup Champions!"

Colour commentators
Cole's long time colour commentator on HNIC was Harry Neale. They were first teamed up in the 1986–87 season. From 1987 to 2007, they broadcast 20 Stanley Cup Finals together. Prior to that, his usual partners included Gary Dornhoefer, Mickey Redmond, or John Davidson. Dick Irvin Jr. also often joined his broadcast team as a third man in the booth for big games. Since the departure of both Neale and Irvin, Jr., his usual color commentators were either Garry Galley and/or Greg Millen.

Curling
Prior to his career in broadcasting, Cole was a successful curler, playing in the 1971 and 1975 Briers as the skip for the Newfoundland team. He also played in the 1965 and 1973 Canadian mixed championship.

Awards
In 2007, Cole captured his first Gemini Award in the area of Sports Play-by-Play.

Cole was inducted into the Hockey Hall of Fame in 1996 as the recipient of the Foster Hewitt Memorial Award for broadcasting excellence.

In 2022, he was named the recipient of the Academy of Canadian Cinema and Television's Lifetime Achievement Award at the 10th Canadian Screen Awards.

Other
Cole received an honorary Doctorate of Laws from Memorial University of Newfoundland in St. John's in 2002.

In early 2016, Cole had a cameo at the end of Simple Plan's album Taking One for the Team, calling a fictional hockey game involving the band; he concluded the call with, "Oh my goodness, can you believe it? Just like that, Simple Plan have won the game!".

On September 23, 2016, Cole was appointed to the Order of Canada.

Cole's voice could be heard in the CBC 2013 TV film The Magic Hockey Skates (based on the book of the same name).

From 2010 to 2014, Cole was the Voice of the Republic on the CBC TV series Republic of Doyle.

References

External links
 The Oral History of Bob Cole 
 
 CBC.ca Sports: Bob Cole biography
 Newfoundland & Labrador Hockey Hall of Fame page

1933 births
Living people
Canadian male film actors
Canadian male television actors
Canadian male voice actors
Canadian people of English descent
Canadian television sportscasters
Curlers from Newfoundland and Labrador
Foster Hewitt Memorial Award winners
Ice hockey people from Newfoundland and Labrador
Members of the Order of Canada
National Hockey League broadcasters
Olympic Games broadcasters
Sportspeople from St. John's, Newfoundland and Labrador
Toronto Maple Leafs announcers
Canadian Screen Award winners